Thomas Lurz (born 28 November 1979) is a German swimmer who specializes in long-distance freestyle swimming, especially open water swimming. Lurz lives in Gerbrunn and swims for the SV Würzburg 05 sports club.

Biography
He competed for Germany at the 2004 Summer Olympics in the 1500 m freestyle, where he missed the final, but returned to the 2008 Summer Olympics, where he won a bronze medal in the 10 km open water race.   At the 2012 Summer Olympics, he finished one place higher, claiming the silver medal.  He was the world champion in the 10 km open-water swimming event in 2004, 2006 and 2009. From to 2005 to 2011, he won gold in the 5 km event seven times in a row. He was jointly awarded the inaugural Open Water Swimmer of the Year by Swimming World Magazine with Chip Peterson, winning following titles in 2006 and 2009 alone and 2011 together with Spyridon Gianniotis.

International medals
He won 20 medals at the World Open Water Swimming Championships.

Achievements

 Ten German titles for 800 m, 1500 m, 5000 m and 10,000 m (open-water) freestyle
 Winner of the European Open Water Competition 2005
 Silver medal in the 1500 m freestyle at the 2005 Summer Universiade
 Gold medal in 5 km event at the 2005 World Aquatics Championships
 Gold medals in 5 km and 10 km events at the 2006 European Aquatics Championships in Budapest
 Gold medal in 5 km event at the 2007 World Aquatics Championships
 Gold medals in 5 km and 10 km events at the 2009 World Aquatics Championships
 Gold medal in 10 km event at the 2010 European Aquatics Championships in Budapest.
 Gold medal in 5 km event at the 2011 World Aquatics Championships
 Silver medal in 10 km event at the 2011 World Aquatics Championships
 Silver medal in 10 km event at the 2012 Olympics in London
 Gold medals in 25 km and 5 km team events at the 2013 World Aquatics Championships
 Silver medal in 10 km event at the 2013 World Aquatics Championships
 Bronze medal in 5 km event at the 2013 World Aquatics Championships

See also
 World Open Water Championships - Multiple medalists
 German records in swimming

References

External links
 
 

1979 births
Male long-distance swimmers
German male swimmers
Living people
Olympic swimmers of Germany
Sportspeople from Würzburg
Swimmers at the 2004 Summer Olympics
Swimmers at the 2008 Summer Olympics
Swimmers at the 2012 Summer Olympics
Olympic silver medalists for Germany
Olympic bronze medalists for Germany
Olympic bronze medalists in swimming
Medalists at the 2012 Summer Olympics
Medalists at the 2008 Summer Olympics
World Aquatics Championships medalists in open water swimming
Olympic silver medalists in swimming
Universiade medalists in swimming
Universiade silver medalists for Germany
Medalists at the 2005 Summer Universiade
European Open Water Swimming Championships medalists